Wuhan University Stomatological Hospital was one of the earliest hospitals of stomatology in China.

History
Wuhan University Stomatological Hospital was founded in 1960.

Personnel

Wuhan University Stomatological Hospital nurtures educators and scholars in dental sciences

Faculty 
Wuhan University Stomatological Hospital employs the integration model of teaching, clinical care, and research. This college has a faculty and staff of 417, including 128 senior faculty members, 38 mentors for Ph.D., and 57 mentors for M.S.

Programs 
West China College of Stomatology has five instruction departments with 24 research sub-units that cover the fields of the basic science of stomatology, oral medicine, oral and maxillofacial surgery, prosthodontics, and orthodontics. Accredited doctoral degree programs are offered in Clinical Science of Stomatology and Basic Science of Stomatology which are included in National Quality Courses. The college offers five-year bachelor's degree programs, seven-year master's degree programs, and eight-year doctoral degree programs.

International Journal of Oral Science

The International Journal of Oral Science, which is listed in the database of Science Citation Index Expanded (SCIE) and PubMed (MEDLINE), was edited and published in English by the college in 2008, with the government's approval as the nation's first English journal on dental sciences in China.

Recognition

 National Doctoral Theses (3), 
 Chief scientist for the nation's 973 Project
 Eminent Professors with Thousand Talent Project (2)
 Eminent Professors with National Changjiang project (2)
 National Outstanding Youth Foundation (2)
 Discipline Review Group of State Department (2)
 National Talents by Ministry of Human Resource Administration 92)
 New Millennium Talents by National Ministry of Education (16)
 Eminent Professor by the National Ministry of Science and Technology (1)
 Specialist (2) by National Ministry of Public Health.

Affiliated organizations

Wuhan University Stomatological Hospital functions as the clinical treatment center for oral diseases and maxillofacial surgery in China because of its ability to provide the full range of diagnostics and therapeutics. The hospital has a 54,540-square-meter clinical building that hosts 350 dental units and 260 in-patient beds. It annually treats about 400,000 outpatients (including emergency cases) and admits 4,000 inpatients, among whom about 3,500 receive procedures.

References

External links 
 College of Stomatology (Chinese)

Dental schools
Hospitals in Wuhan
Wuhan University